Serhiy Romanishyn (born 3 September 1975) is a former Ukrainian football player. He was the first Ukrainian footballer to play in the Albanian Superliga and was also the first to win the 2002 league title in Albania with Dinamo Tirana.

References

Living people
1975 births
Ukrainian footballers
Ukrainian expatriate footballers
Expatriate footballers in Russia
Ukrainian expatriate sportspeople in Russia
Expatriate footballers in Albania
Ukrainian expatriate sportspeople in Albania
Association football defenders
Kategoria Superiore players
FC Neftekhimik Nizhnekamsk players